Such a Little Queen is a 1921 American silent film drama starring Constance Binney and directed by George Fawcett, who usually appeared in front of the camera as a character actor. This film is a remake of the 1914 film of the same name which served as an early feature length vehicle for Mary Pickford who had recently arrived at Adolph Zukor's Famous Players studio. The source material for both films was the 1909 Broadway play by Channing Pollock that starred Elsie Ferguson in a breakout stage role. It is not known whether the 1921 film currently survives.

Plot
As described in a film magazine, a revolution within its borders forces the hasty flight of the little queen, Anne Victoria (Binney), to America. She arrives with only her trusted legal adviser Baron Cosaco (Gilmour) and they take quarters in the tenement district. The king of the neighboring principality, Stephen of Hetland (Coleman), to whom she is betrothed, also flees to America. He, too, is in reduced circumstance and they both accept employment in the office of a large meat packer. Its owner, Adolph Lawton (Losee), has just returned from Europe where he was trying to find a titled husband for his daughter Elizabeth (Carpenter). The general manager of the office falls in love with the little queen. The ex-king is accused of stealing some bonds, but is freed of the charge when the real thief is captured. The king and queen return to their respective countries and thrones wedding bells sounding in the distance.

Cast
Constance Binney as Anne Victoria of Gzbfernigambia
Vincent Coleman as Stephen of Hetland
J. H. Gilmour as Baron Cosaco
Roy Fernandez as Bob Trainor
Frank Losee as Adolph Lawton
Betty Carpenter as Elizabeth Lawton
Jessie Ralph as Mary (Ralph appeared in the 1909 play)
Henry Leone as Boris

References

External links

1921 films
American silent feature films
American films based on plays
1921 drama films
Silent American drama films
American black-and-white films
1920s American films